"Son of Man" is a song by Phil Collins for the soundtrack of Disney's Tarzan. In the 1999 animated film, the song accompanies a montage in which Tarzan learns how to be an ape and progresses from childhood to adulthood. Along the way, he picks up skills from fellow jungle inhabitants--including a rhino, john  monkeys, and hippopotamuses--and duels with an African rock python. The song peaked at number 68 on the German Media Control Charts as well as at number 96 on the French Singles Chart.

Track listing
"Son of Man"
"You'll Be in My Heart"

Track listing Germany CD-MAXI
"Son of Man (single version)" 2:46
"Dir gehört mein Herz" (You'll Be in My Heart German version) 1:39
"En mi corazón estarás" (You'll Be in My Heart Spanish version) 1:39
"Sei dentro me" (You'll Be in My Heart Italian version) 1:39

The French (Enfant de l'homme), German (So ein Mann), Italian (In tuo figlio) and Spanish (Hijo de hombre) versions are all sung by Phil Collins.

Personnel
Phil Collins – lead and backing vocals, keyboards, drums, electric guitar
Nathan East – electric bass

Charts

References

1999 songs
2000 singles
Phil Collins songs
Songs from Disney's Tarzan
Songs written by Phil Collins
Song recordings produced by Phil Collins
Disney Renaissance songs
Walt Disney Records singles